Frances Clytie Rivett-Carnac née Greenstock (16 May 1874 – 1 January 1962) was a British sailor who competed in the 1908 Summer Olympics. She was a crew member of the British boat Heroine III, the only boat in the 7 metre class. Because a second British entry failed to make it to the start, the boat was required to complete just one lap of two races to win. Her husband Charles Rivett-Carnac was also a crew member and won Olympic gold. Their granddaughter Cleone Rivett-Carnac was an athlete in New Zealand.

References

External links
profile
 
 

1874 births
1962 deaths
British female sailors (sport)
Sailors at the 1908 Summer Olympics – 7 Metre
Olympic sailors of Great Britain
Olympic gold medallists for Great Britain
Olympic medalists in sailing
Frances
Medalists at the 1908 Summer Olympics